Epacris marginata is a species of flowering plant in the heath family Ericaceae and is endemic to Tasmania.

Epacris marginata was first formally described in 1952 by Ronald Melville in the Kew Bulletin from specimens collected by Janet Somerville  on the "slopes of Brown Mountain, Tasman Peninsula" in 1946.

This epacris is restricted to the Tasman Peninsula in Tasmania.

References

marginata
Ericales of Australia
Flora of Tasmania
Plants described in 1952